Cornelius MacArdel was Bishop of Clogher from 1560 to 1568.

See also
Roman Catholic Diocese of Clogher

References

Roman Catholic bishops of Clogher
1568 deaths
16th-century Irish bishops